Biji-Biji Initiative is a Malaysian an environmental based social enterprise company that provides a range of up-cycling and art installation services. The core solutions by Biji-biji Initiative are in the fields of
 green technology
 sustainability consultancy
 design & fabrication
 ethical fashion
 skills education
Currently its operations are based at two open workshops in Jalan Ipoh, Kuala Lumpur and a factory in Klang, Selangor.

Background 
Biji-Biji was formed in December 2012, beginning by tackling environmental issues through up-cycling and repurposing waste into gifts and products. Biji-Biji opened their first Open Workshop in Jalan Sungkai, off Jalan Ipoh in 2013. The main activities done is woodworking and metalworking. Later in 2015, a second Open Workshop was opened at Jalan Nangka, off Jalan Ipoh. The main activities in this workshop are electronics, stitching and tailoring. Besides that, Biji-Biji also practices open source ideas, which is idea and information sharing. Biji-biji will be basing its operations from a public friendly maker-space from May 2017 in Publika, Kuala Lumpur.

Collaborations
 Biji-biji x Ecoworld
Property developer Eco World Development Group Berhad (Ecoworld) collaborated with Biji-biji Initiative to organise Ecofestival at Ecoworld’s Eco Sky project site in Jalan Ipoh to spread awareness on “upcycling” through various art installations in the hope to shed light on upcycling as a way to create a positive difference for the environment.

2. Biji-biji x C.I.S Network Sdn Bhd

C.I.S Network Sdn Bhd signed a MoU with Biji-biji Initiative and the Malaysian Association of Convention and Exhibition Organisers and Suppliers’ (MACEOS) to recycle waste produced from the 16th International Architecture, Interior Design & Building Exhibition (ARCHIDEX 2015) into durable trendy bags.

3. Biji-biji x Urbanscapes

iM4U with the help of Biji-biji Initiative and Do Something Good kickstarted the iM4U Green Team at Urbanscapes 2013, MAEPS Serdang. Biji-biji Initiative collaborated with other international and local artists to produce art installation at Urbanscapes 2014.

4. Biji-biji x Publika

Biji-biji Initiative and other local artists collaborated for Publika Lantern Installation which uses recycled water cooler bottles controlled by electronics as to celebrate Chinese New Year in Publika Boulevard, Kuala Lumpur.

5.  Biji-biji x Art for Grabs

Biji-biji took part in KL Art for Grabs Festival 2015 by showcasing their retail bags made from rejected seat belts.

6. Biji-biji x Ministry of Youth and Sports

Biji biji collaborated with Ministry of Youth and Sports in becoming one of the mentors under the newly-revamped Rakan Muda programme - a programme to develop the youths of Malaysia.

7. Biji-biji x Pernod Ricard

Biji-biji collaborated with Pernod Ricard Malaysia in producing Brightboxes to be donated to Yayasan Nanyang for the Nepal earthquake victims.

8. Biji-biji x Yayasan Inovasi Malaysia

Yayasan Inovasi Malaysia collaborated with various parties including Biji-biji in creating a platform called ‘Donate Your Idea’

Awards
 Biji-biji along with 5 others Malaysia social enterprises received funding from the AGP-British Council “Entrepreneurs for Good” Wave 1 programme.
 Biji-biji received RM58,000 grants awarded by SHELL Malaysia.
 Biji-biji won the coveted Tan Sri Entrepreneurship Award of RM250,000 at the Alliance Bank BizSmart Academy SME Innovation Challenge 2014 Grand Finale Awards Ceremony.
 Biji-biji became the recipient of the Technology Innovation Award for 2015 Frost & Sullivan Malaysia Excellence Awards.

References

Environmental organisations based in Malaysia
Companies established in 2012
2012 establishments in Malaysia